This is a listing of the ministers who serve in the National Democratic Congress government of John Dramani Mahama in Ghana originally formed on 24 July 2012 following the death of John Atta Mills, and sworn in from January 2013. The government lost the December 2016 general election and its rule ended on 7 January 2017 when Nana Akufo-Addo of the New Patriotic Party became president.

Ministers (January 2013 onwards)

Nominations for vetting
Following the swearing-in of President Mahama on 7 January 2013, the Parliament of Ghana vetted his nominations for Ministers of state from mid-January.

There were three sets of nominations submitted to the Parliament of Ghana in all for appointment as Ministers of state by President Mahama. The initial list contained 12 nominations  A second list of 7 nominations were sent for approval about a week later. A third list of 12 nominees were added, including 6 Ministers of state at the Presidency. 2 further regional ministers were added to the list of nominees in early February 2013.

All the nominees for sector ministries were approved. The nominees for Ministers of state at the Presidency are listed below:

In addition to the list above, Paul Victor Obeng was to be a Senior Presidential Advisor at the Presidency. Three others were nominated to oversee priority projects of the President. They were Enoch Teye Mensah (MP), Alban Bagbin (MP) and Cletus Avoka (MP).

List of ministers from January 2013
President Mahama swore in the first batch of seven ministers on 30 January 2013 following their approval by parliament.  After the approval of more nominees by Parliament on 1 February 2013 and 12 February 2013, a further 17 ministers were sworn in on 14 February 2013. A number of nominated Ministers at the Presidency were approved by parliament on 15 February 2013.

Changes in government
President Mahama on 11 March 2013 reshuffled regional ministers he appointed into office for the first time. On 16 July 2014, Mahama had another cabinet reshuffle involving a lot of ministries.
At the end of May 2014, President Mahama did a cabinet reshuffle. This resulted in Akwasi Oppong Fosu, the Local Government minister losing his job. He was replaced by the Eastern Regional minister, Julius Debrah. Antwi Boasiako-Sekyere was nominated to replace Julius Debrah as the Eastern Regional minister.

Ministers (July 2012 to January 2013)
Mahama became the President of Ghana following the sudden death of John Atta Mills on 24 July 2012. He was sworn in by the Chief Justice of Ghana Georgina Wood later the same day. A week after being sworn in as president, Mahama chose Kwesi Amissah-Arthur to be the vice president.

Changes in government
Henry Kamel, Volta Regional Minister died on Christmas Day 2012 after diabetes complications.

This set of ministers, had all been appointed by President Mills and continued until January 2013 when his term would have ended. The exception was Henry Kamel, who died after the 7 December election but before the formal handover on 7 January 2013. The ministers were advised to stay on as caretaker ministers until new ones had been confirmed in their place.

See also
National Democratic Congress
Rawlings government
List of Mills government ministers

References

External links and sources
Ghana government official website: List of Ministers

Mahama government ministers
2013 establishments in Ghana
Lists of government ministers of Ghana
Mahama government ministers